Lieutenant General Samuel Davis Sturgis III (July 16, 1897 – July 5, 1964), also known as Samuel D. Sturgis Jr., was a senior officer of the United States Army who served as Chief of Engineers during the Cold War.

Early life 
Samuel Davis Sturgis III was born in St. Paul, Minnesota and came from a military family. Both his father, Samuel D. Sturgis Jr., and grandfather, also named Samuel D. Sturgis, were West Point graduates and major generals.

Career 

Sturgis graduated from the United States Military Academy in 1918. As a junior engineer officer, he taught mathematics at the academy for four years. In 1926, he was ordered to the Philippines, where he served as Adjutant of the 14th Engineers. His strategical studies of the islands over a three-year period developed knowledge he used later when he returned to the Philippines in 1944 as Chief Engineer of General Walter Krueger's Sixth U.S. Army. Sturgis commanded a mounted engineer company at Fort Riley, Kansas, in 1929–1933 and encouraged the adoption of heavy mechanical equipment.  He was district engineer in 1939–1942 for Vicksburg, Mississippi, where he worked on flood control and a large military construction program. He served as chief engineer of the Sixth Army in 1943–1946.

During World War II, Sturgis' engineer troops built roads, airfields, ports, and bases from New Guinea to the Philippines. After the war, Sturgis was senior engineer for the army air forces in 1946-1948 and was Missouri River Division Engineer in 1949–51.  In 1951, he became the Commanding General of the 6th Armored Division and Fort Leonard Wood, Missouri. In 1952, he was appointed Commanding General of the Communications Zone supporting the United States Army in Europe. He became Chief of Engineers on March 17, 1953.

Death 
He died July 5, 1964, in Washington, D.C. and was buried at Arlington National Cemetery, in Arlington, Virginia, with his wife Frances Jewett.

Personal life
In 1921, Sturgis married Frances Jewett Murray (1897–1975), the daughter of Brigadier General Peter Murray (1867–1940) and Harriet Tingley Jewett (1871–1932).

Awards 
His military decorations include the Distinguished Service Medal with Oak Leaf Cluster, the Silver Star, and the Legion of Merit.
   Army Distinguished Service Medal with oak leaf cluster
   Silver Star
   Legion of Merit
 World War I Victory Medal
 American Defense Service Medal
 American Campaign Medal
 Asiatic-Pacific Campaign Medal
 World War II Victory Medal
 Army of Occupation Medal
 National Defense Service Medal
 Philippine Liberation Medal

References

This article contains public domain text from the U.S. Army.

Further reading
 
Generals of World War II

1897 births
1964 deaths
United States Army Corps of Engineers personnel
United States Army personnel of World War I
American military engineers
Burials at Arlington National Cemetery
Military personnel of the Cold War
Military personnel from Minnesota
People from Saint Paul, Minnesota
Recipients of the Distinguished Service Medal (US Army)
Recipients of the Legion of Merit
Recipients of the Silver Star
United States Army generals
United States Military Academy alumni
United States Military Academy faculty
United States Army generals of World War II